

Results

See also
1999 UCI Mountain Bike World Championships
1999 UCI Mountain Bike World Cup
UCI Mountain Bike & Trials World Championships

References

 Official results

Downhill men